Neighborhoods is the sixth studio album by American rock band Blink-182, released September 27, 2011, through DGC Records and Interscope. Their first album of new material in eight years (the longest gap between albums to date), its recording followed the band's breakup and later reconciliation. Due to conflicts within the trio, the band entered an "indefinite hiatus" in 2005 and the members explored various side-projects. After two separate tragedies regarding the band and their entourage, the members of Blink-182 decided to reunite in late 2008, with plans for a new album and tour. It was the last studio album to feature founding member Tom DeLonge until his return to the band in 2022.

The band's studio autonomy, tours, managers, and personal projects stalled the recording process, which lasted from shortly after the band's February 2009 reunion to July 2011. Blink-182 developed Neighborhoods in separate studios and regrouped at various periods to record. Their numerous delays in the recording process resulted in the cancelation of a European tour and the label setting a deadline for the album to be due. The trio wrote lyrics on such subjects as isolation, confusion, and death. They infused inspiration from each member's various musical tastes to form a unique sound that recalled their separate upbringings, leading the trio to compare the album to separate neighborhoods.

Neighborhoods was released to mixed reviews from critics; some felt it was a natural evolution from the band's previous releases, while others found it stale and disjointed. The album debuted at number two on the Billboard 200 and "Up All Night" and "After Midnight" were released as singles, with both attracting modest success on Billboard's Alternative Songs chart. Despite this, Neighborhoods did not sell as well as earlier releases and the band would depart from Interscope the following fall.

Background

Blink-182 announced on February 22, 2005, that they would be going on an "indefinite hiatus". The decision, in reality a breakup of the group, stemmed from internal band tension, which had arisen in late 2004 during their European tour. Guitarist and vocalist Tom DeLonge expressed his desire to take a half-year respite from touring in order to spend more time with family. Bassist/vocalist Mark Hoppus and drummer Travis Barker were dismayed by his decision, which they felt was an overly long break. Following the 2004 Indian Ocean earthquake, DeLonge agreed to perform at Music for Relief's Concert for South Asia, a benefit show to aid victims. Further arguments ensued during rehearsals, rooted in the band members' increasing paranoia and bitterness toward one another. DeLonge felt his priorities were "mad different", and the breakdown in communication led to heated exchanges, resulting in his exit from the group. During the hiatus, DeLonge formed the rock band Angels & Airwaves, while Barker and Hoppus continued playing together in +44. Two events in late 2008 would lead to the band's eventual reformation: the death of longtime producer Jerry Finn (who suffered a cerebral hemorrhage) and a near-fatal plane crash involving Barker and collaborator DJ AM.

The two incidents raised rumors of a possible Blink-182 reunion. Hoppus was alerted about Barker's accident by a phone call in the middle of the night and jumped on the next flight to the burn center. DeLonge learned of the crash via the TV news at an airport while waiting to board a flight. He landed and mailed a letter and two photographs to Barker: a photo of Blink aboard a submarine in the Middle East and another of himself and his two kids. "One was 'Do you remember who we were?' and the other was 'This is who I am now'" DeLonge said. He also commented that, no matter what had happened between himself and Barker in the past, "none of it matters when it comes down to somebody getting hurt". Hoppus first spoke on the matter in a blog post in November 2008, writing that he "hadn't had it in him" to post, adding that "these past two months have been the hardest times I can remember". He also revealed that he, DeLonge, and Barker had all spoken in the aftermath. Barker quashed reunion rumors in December, but noted that they had been getting along.

Talk of a reunion commenced weeks after the trio began speaking again. After a two-hour phone conversation between DeLonge and Hoppus, an arrangement was made for the trio to meet up at Hoppus and Barker's Los Angeles studio in October 2008. DeLonge was the first to approach the subject of reuniting. The trio had, in Hoppus' words, "two gnarly heart-to-hearts", during which the three opened up. "Tom had just kind of come out to Los Angeles for the day", recalled Hoppus, "I remember he said, 'So, what do you guys think? Where are your heads at?' And I said, 'I think we should continue with what we've been doing for the past 17 years. I think we should get back on the road and back in the studio and do what we love doing'". Eventually, the band appeared for the first time on stage together in nearly five years as presenters at the 51st Grammy Awards on February 8, 2009. The band's official website was updated with a statement: "To put it simply, we're back. We mean, really back. Picking up where we left off and then some. In the studio writing and recording a new album. Preparing to tour the world yet again. Friendships reformed. 17 years deep in our legacy."

Recording and production

Blink-182 began recording demos of new material in 2009. All three members brought song ideas that they had worked on for years. As the band got back together, Barker said that the trio immediately "got inspired" by practicing their old songs and listening to them again, and they decided to record demos. There were four demos done, and only one was near completion, "Up All Night". The trio wanted to release it as a single then, but quickly realized that it was too ambitious to complete it before their reunion tour began in July. Sessions were stalled by the summer 2009 reunion tour, during which the band reconnected musically and emotionally. During the tour, Barker got a phone call that DJ AM had overdosed and died in New York, which heavily affected him. In addition to the tragedy regarding DJ AM, DeLonge was diagnosed with skin cancer the following year, but this eventually cleared up. The band did a large amount of writing before leaving on tour, but upon its completion, they took time off to "chill and do other stuff", with intentions to regroup in 2010. In June and July 2010, Blink-182 spent time at their rehearsal spot, with the intention to wrap up touring by September and stay in the studio for the rest of the year until the record was finished. The album sessions were to be partially documented in The Blinkumentary, which was scrapped in 2012.

The recording and release of Neighborhoods was delayed multiple times. This was due to the way the band chose to work—in bits and pieces, alone and together, in a pair of California studios—in addition to each member's busy schedules. The album was recorded at both DeLonge's studio in San Diego and in Los Angeles by Hoppus and Barker.  Recording in separate studios was DeLonge's idea, and ideas were exchanged via email. Various engineers met up in person to trade files on hard drives. Although the three musicians were rarely in the same room while recording, opting to work on their parts individually, DeLonge asserted that the method of recording was a more efficient way of working considering their schedules, not due to a lack of unity within the band. In addition, Barker was releasing a solo record, DeLonge was involved in Angels & Airwaves, and Hoppus had to fly to New York City once a week to film his television show, Hoppus on Music. The record was the band's first to be self-produced, due to the death of longtime producer Jerry Finn in 2008. Not only did Finn helm their last three studio albums, but he served as an invaluable member of the band: part adviser, part impartial observer, he helped smooth out tensions and hone their sound. "I honestly still feel like he's in the studio with us, because for me, personally, everything that was about recording and being in a studio, I learned from Jerry", said Hoppus. Instead of a producer, each band member had their own dedicated sound engineer, with Hoppus and DeLonge receiving help from longtime co-production partners Chris Holmes and "Critter", respectively. DeLonge, who was against using a producer after self-producing most of his Angels & Airwaves records, described the band situation as "very democratic", noting that he learned during the recording process to "let go and be okay with not being able to control everything".

Hoppus attributed the album's delay to the band learning to work by themselves without Finn, and both he and DeLonge expressed frustration during the sessions at the band's cabal of publicists, managers, and attorneys (which DeLonge described as "the absolute diarrhea of bureaucracy"). A result of the trio's split was each members hiring his own attorney, and, during the Neighborhoods sessions, they had a total of four managers. Later, it was revealed that DeLonge and Hoppus would go months without direct communication, only speaking through their managers. Hoppus moved to London with his family late in the recording process, also complicating matters. Under pressure, the band released a statement in April that effectively rescheduled all European tour dates due to the album's prolonged recording. The decision—a "hugely expensive" one—was protested by DeLonge but pushed forward by Barker, who felt the trio had made commitments to only tour with new material.  The biggest argument of the recording process ensued, resulting in Geffen Records setting a July 31 deadline for the record amid concerns about the volatility of the band, explaining there would be penalties if the album was not turned in on time. DeLonge joked that, "We'll probably actually drive it to the [Geffen] president's house at two in the morning and hand it through his bedroom window at the last possible minute". The band, as a whole, only entered the studio for "one or two weeks" following the release of the statement in the spring, with only three days dedicated to writing. Recording lasted through May and into the summer, and by the time of the July 31 deadline, the record was near completion and finally completed through August.

Composition

Music and lyrics

Stylistically, Neighborhoods has been described as alternative rock, pop punk, and pop rock, while moving the band's sound into "prog-punk" territory. Pre-release, the album was described by the band as ambitious, weird, and expansive. The music of the album was inspired by each musician's tastes: DeLonge's contributions bear hints of stadium rock, Barker infuses hip hop into his drum tracks, and Hoppus felt compelled by "weird indie rock." Hoppus stated early on that a goal for the album was to try many new things, but to remain a catchy and "poppy" sensibility. The lyricism of the album was influenced by heavy events in each member's life during the latter part of the decade, elements considered dark by Hoppus. The band made sure to produce a few throwback songs recalling their sound in the "mid-90s."

Though DeLonge hoped to retain the angst present in the band's past work, he wanted to "deliver it in a package that's very modern, using instrumentations and formulas to launch you into different places with music that is not just three-chord pop-punk with riffs". He later felt the album was not progressive as he had wished: "I'm thinking, 'Why don't we do this? Why don't we create these landscapes?' I think we should have been pushing ourselves, and trying to push the genre forward". Likewise, Barker felt DeLonge wanted their music to be derivative of groups such as U2 or Coldplay, commenting, "For us, we were always like 'Blink is Blink, man. We want to sound like fucking Blink-182'".

Hoppus wrote lyrics dealing with breakdowns in communication and trust and tackled themes of isolation and confusion, but these lyrics were not specific to any of the band's history. He struggled with writing upbeat, happy songs for the album and attributed the dark lyricism to heavy events occurring shortly before the reunion. MTV News called Neighborhoods the "bleakest thing Blink have ever done, haunted by specters both real—depression, addiction, loss—and imagined", noting the constant lyrical mention of death in many tracks. The album mixes the electronic flourishes of +44 and the "laser-light grandeur" of Angels & Airwaves into what MTV News called "a sound that recalls nothing so much as dark streets and black expanses, mostly of the suburban variety".

Packaging and title
The title Neighborhoods evolved out of the trio discovering that each bring a very different aesthetic to the band, each like different neighborhoods in a city. "Everybody in the world thinks of something unique unto themselves when they hear the word 'Neighborhoods'", said Hoppus. "To some it is a big city, others a small town, others suburbia, everything. The world is wide, exciting and very different. That's what Neighborhoods means to me". The album artwork for the record was revealed on August 4, 2011, and featured the band name written atop a city skyline. The Neighborhoods sleeve contains many names close to the band, including Chloe (DeLonge's pet Labrador Retriever),  Ava and Jon (DeLonge's daughter Ava Elizabeth and son Jonas Rocket), Jack (Hoppus' son), Landon, Alabama and Ati (Barker's son, daughter, and stepdaughter, Atiana), G! (Mike Giant, designer of the cover), and lastly, a memorial to DJ AM.

Songs

"Ghost on the Dance Floor" opens the album and is specifically about "hearing a song you shared with someone that's passed". The track resonated with Barker, who called DeLonge one night because the song affected him while listening to it, due to the death of DJ AM. "Natives" first arose from a tribal beat Barker created in the studio, and the song's title changed multiple times before settling on simplicity. "Up All Night" is the album's oldest song, dating to just after the band's 2009 reunion, when they grouped together and produced demos. The band returned to it multiple times over the recording process, each time making it heavier than before. "After Midnight" was one of four new songs birthed from a last-minute writing session after the band canceled their European tour. Barker's favorite track (and originally titled "Travis Beat") was written in separate studios but composed and recorded together.

"Snake Charmer", initially titled "Genesis", as a reference to the Book of Genesis, is based on the biblical story of Adam and Eve. It predates the band's reunion, and was a guitar riff DeLonge kept around to expand upon in the future. The song's coda was composed by Barker and engineer Chris Holmes. Hoppus composed two versions of "Heart's All Gone", one fast and one slow, and ended up liking both, so the slower version serves as an interlude on the album's deluxe edition. "Wishing Well" was solely created by DeLonge, and is what Hoppus describes as the epitome of the album: "It's very catchy, but the lyrics are really, really dark and a little depressing". "Kaleidoscope" arose when Hoppus woke up with the song's opening lyrics in his head, which he expanded into a Descendents-ish classic punk song. "The mentality behind it is being a slacker in 2011", Hoppus said. "The 20s and 30s malaise that is America right now". It was also inspired by the album's lengthy recording process and the transformation of the band. "This Is Home" was originally titled "Scars to Blame", but changed considerably when Hoppus took the chorus and bridge and combined it with new lyrics written by DeLonge, morphing it into what he described as "an anthem for youthful abandon".

"MH 4.18.2011" was a working title for a song that was to be named "Hold On", and represents a combination of Hoppus' initials and the date he wrote the song. However, DeLonge convinced Hoppus to keep the original title because he thought it sounded cool, likening it to a virus. The song was inspired by one occasion in which Hoppus was idle at a stoplight when a helicopter flew overahead, casting a large shadow. He began to think of war-torn countries and impoverished areas in which circling helicopters are a "way of life", and wrote the song to capture that mentality. The track is notable for being recorded without DeLonge's involvement, with Hoppus recording all of the guitars in addition to his usual bass and vocals. "Love Is Dangerous" arose from a minimalist, electronic ballad, but gradually took on a heavier sound when combined with guitars. Hoppus described "Fighting the Gravity" as a "very strange song", and highlighted its production: he ran a drum machine through his bass amp, and when the volume was turned up, it shook the entire building, causing a light fixture in the control room to start shaking. Hoppus and Holmes mic-ed up the fixture, creating the rattling heard near the beginning. "Even If She Falls" is an upbeat, "catchy love song" that Hoppus viewed as a positive note to end the record on.

Release and promotion

Expectations for Neighborhoods were described by Alternative Press as "truly gigantic, both within the music industry and the record-buying mainstream". MTV News called Neighborhoods one of the most anticipated albums of 2010 when the album was scheduled for that year, and then again as one of the most anticipated rock albums of 2011. Kerrang! also called it one of the most anticipated releases of 2011,  and it was also featured on a list of Spin "26 Fall Albums That Matter Most". The album title and release date were officially announced in July 2011. In preparation for the deluxe edition, the band compiled ten tracks as well as three extras. The deluxe edition tracks are sequenced differently from the standard version. "Up All Night" was released as the album's lead single on July 14, and the band began streaming another new song, "Heart's All Gone", through a dedicated website on August 4. The second single from Neighborhoods, titled "After Midnight", premiered on BBC Radio 1 on September 6, 2011. "Wishing Well" was released November 21, 2011, as a promotional single to alternative radio exclusively in the UK.

The album leaked two weeks before its release, despite being under a very high level of security. Hoppus commented to NME that he was surprised it took so long to leak and was relieved rather than annoyed that it had, reading warm comments about the album online.

Blink-182 returned to Interscope Records to distribute the album, but found the music industry landscape dramatically different since the band's last effort. "The label itself has no resources or capital to do what they used to", DeLonge said in an interview with Billboard, "They just have you locked up on a contract". Interscope, since the band's breakup, had greatly pared down its rock department, in contrast to other labels. Blink-182 broke up at a heightened popularity period for pop-punk, but Neighborhoods was released in an era for the genre that Billboard described as "lacking exciting mainstream representation", in addition to falling sales for peer bands. The trio approached sponsorships, song releases, and social media incorporation during the rollout of Neighborhoods. Social media such as Facebook and Twitter were present throughout each stage of the album, which Hoppus believed allowed more direct access and control over the band's music. Although Modlife, DeLonge's revenue-sharing online service, was not involved in the promotion of the record, the band's personal business projects were integrated, such as Macbeth Footwear and Famous Stars and Straps. Retailers such as Hot Topic and Interpunk.com carried different-colored vinyl editions of Neighborhoods that included MP3 download cards. The band partnered with AT&T in order to promote the album, appearing in a national spot for the HTC Status; they also partnered with Best Buy, which sold a uniquely colored HTC Status preloaded with the band's music. Television ads through networks such as ESPN were explored the week of release. In addition, Hoppus and DeLonge appeared in a "film festival" for the fan montage video of "Up All Night", honoring various internet fans through tongue-in-cheek categories.

Critical reception

Neighborhoods received generally positive reviews from contemporary music critics. At Metacritic, which assigns a normalized rating out of 100 to reviews from mainstream critics, the album received an average score of 69, based on 18 reviews, which indicates "generally favorable reviews". A pre-release review from NME regarded Neighborhoods as the band's best album, calling it "bravely progressive" and noting the dark lyricism and random experimentation. Mike Diver of BBC Music described the album as "unexpectedly great", and while agreeing the recording process gave some tracks a "dislocated feel", he concluded that "Neighborhoods could easily have been a disaster—that it's not, and actually a very successful endeavour, is worthy of substantial praise". Chad Grischow of IGN called Neighborhoods a "startlingly great rock album" in which the band "hits an artistic growth spurt", summarizing it as "the most mature, rewarding, and best album of their career". James Montgomery of MTV News called the "long-awaited, decidedly dark comeback album" a new transition for the band, calling Neighborhoods a "deep, dark, downright auto-biographical effort". AbsolutePunk staff writer Thomas Nassiff called Neighborhoods a "great record", awarding it a score of nine out of ten. He noted the album's "bleak and dark" lyricism, while describing its sound as containing elements of the trio's various side projects, as well as being a natural progression from their 2003 album. Nitsuh Abebe of New York Magazine deemed the record "one of those albums on which a group reunites as professionals and equals, each having gone off and collected his own interests via side projects, and then negotiates a sound that brings it all to bear: no-nonsense modern rock, serious but unpretentious, ambitious but full of the same easy hooks as ever".

Writing for AllMusic, Stephen Thomas Erlewine remarked that Neighborhoods is "a different beast than any of the cheerfully snotty early Blink-182 albums, as the band picks up the gloomy thread left hanging on its eponymous 2003 album...yet it's far better to hear Blink-182 grapple with adolescent angst via the perspective of middle age than vainly attempting to re-create their youth. Perhaps Blink could stand to sharpen their words but it's better that they concentrated on their music, creating a fairly ridiculous yet mildly compelling prog-punk spin on the suburbs here". Tom Goodwyn of NME remarked that the album finds the band "completely at ease with its past and confident enough to acknowledge their early work, with nods on the album to moments from their whole back catalogue". British rock magazine Kerrang awarded Neighborhoods a "good" three-out-of-five score in their review. Critic Mark Sutherland noted that while "the finished product is inevitably disjointed, Blink emerge as a surprisingly serious rock proposition". He went on to add that, "While it occasionally sounds like Mark, Tom, and Travis are playing three different songs at once ('Kaleidoscope', 'After Midnight'), the band are still capable of producing genuine moments of magnificence". Scott Heisel of Alternative Press attributed the album's flaws to the lack of an outside producer and the fact that only a few tracks were written and recorded as a group: "Blink-182's members are still capable of writing good songs, but without a strong outside influence (i.e., a producer) and no real desire or effort to consistently work in the same room with one another, the amount of truly transcendent, classic material is minimal. Ultimately, Neighborhoods is a slightly awkward entry in the band's catalog that shows as much potential as it does flaws".

Kyle Anderson of Entertainment Weekly awarded the album a "B−" grade, opining that, "the peaks on Neighborhoods—their first disc in eight years—do little more than recall past triumphs. Outside of some latent goth leanings ('This Is Home') and a gauzy detour ('Ghost on the Dance Floor'), it's mostly twitch-crunch-whine-repeat". Michael Brown of Drowned in Sound gave a mixed review, awarding the album a lukewarm five out of ten. He critiqued that, "Blink have the potential for much more than their past reputation may convey, but Neighborhoods is reminiscent of that first awkward conversation after a heated argument, as no-one's quite sure where to go next". Jon Dolan of Rolling Stone gave the album three stars out of five, noting elements of sophistication, introspection, and darkness in the music and lyrics and commenting that "Some Clinton-era pants-dropping might've been a fun nostalgia move. But those days are gone; it's their early-2010s nightmare as much as anyone else's". Kyle Ryan of The A.V. Club was critical of DeLonge's vocals, saying that he "sounds flat as ever, and has a fondness for clunky lyrics", concluding that "Although Blink-182 has long since left its past as a bare-bones punk band behind, overwrought rock isn't its forte, either. Neighborhoods finds a nice balance between the two, but it could still use a little less fussiness". Jonathan Keefe of Slant Magazine considered it uninspired: "When they try to add relatively ambitious elements to the things they actually do well, Blink-182 is more successful. [...] It's admirable that Blink-182 tries to challenge themselves over the course of Neighborhoods, but their growing pains don't make for a particularly good album or a welcome comeback". Scott McLennan of The Boston Globe considered the album a step forward, summarizing, "Blink-182 again delivers a record with nothing outright awful and enough dynamite songs to pack a punch at future tours". Mikael Wood of Spin called the album "surprisingly and refreshingly low-key", but its self-examination "comparatively adrift" with the sound of their past.

Commercial performance
Neighborhoods debuted at number two on the Billboard 200, with 151,000 copies sold in its first week. The album dropped to position 10 in its second week, and fell out of the top 20 soon afterward. It also debuted at number one on both the magazine's Alternative Albums and Top Rock Albums charts, number two on the Digital Albums chart, and number four on Tastemaker Albums. Internationally, the album performed best in Canada and Australia, where it also debuted in the number two position. In New Zealand, it peaked at number three, while it debuted at number six on the UK Albums Chart and in Germany.

Despite this, sales were not as smooth as the group's label, Interscope, had hoped, according to Billboard: "Despite the extended hiatus between albums, Neighborhoods failed to connect on the same scale as earlier releases". As of May 2016, it had sold 353,000 units in the US. In the United Kingdom, the album went Silver, certifying sales of 60,000 units, and it was certified Gold in Australia for sales of 35,000 copies.

Touring and aftermath

Blink-182 first began touring in support of Neighborhoods with the 10th Annual Honda Civic Tour in August 2011. The 2011 edition marked the tenth anniversary of the tour, which Blink-182 headlined in its first incarnation. Together with My Chemical Romance, the trio fronted the 10th Annual Honda Civic Tour, which ran from August to October 2011, with additional dates scheduled in Canada with Rancid and Against Me!. In 2012, the band embarked on a worldwide 20th Anniversary Tour. They continued touring in 2012, performing the rescheduled European dates originally canceled in order to continue recording. They were scheduled to headline the Bamboozle 2012 Music Festival but canceled when Barker had to undergo an operation for tonsilitis. The 20th Anniversary Tour extended into Australia in 2013 as part of the Soundwave festival, as well as four sideshows in the US with punk acts The Vandals and Sharks. Barker, who still suffers a fear of flying, did not attend; Brooks Wackerman, drummer of Bad Religion at the time, filled in for the Australian leg of the tour.

Blink-182 looked back on Neighborhoods later with divided reactions. In 2012, DeLonge would concede that the recording method, originally his idea, led to a loss of unity, noting that emails dictated the majority of recording, due to the band members' hectic schedules. "There's some songs on there that I love, but for the most part it was disconnected", Barker recalled. "It was like, 'You do this part in your studio, and then you're gonna play on it and send it back to me'. When we're not in the studio together, you don't have the opportunity to gel off each other". In addition, Barker was still recovering from his 2008 plane crash, which made things difficult in the studio. "Dude, I was still healing", he told Rolling Stone. "I had scabs all over my body and was, like, a bloody mess. It was just way too soon".

In 2015, following DeLonge's departure, Barker claimed DeLonge "didn't even care about [Neighborhoods]. He didn't even listen to mixes or masterings from that record".

Track listing

Personnel
Adapted from the album's liner notes.

Blink-182
 Mark Hoppus – bass guitar, vocals, guitars, production
 Tom DeLonge – guitars, vocals, production
 Travis Barker – drums, percussion, production

Additional musicians
 Roger Joseph Manning Jr. – keyboards

Production
 Neal Avron – mix engineer 
 Jeff "Critter" Newell – co-producer
 Paul Frye – assistant recording engineer
 Femio Hernández – assistant recording engineer

 Chris Holmes – co-producer, mix engineer 
 James Ingram – recording engineer, additional engineering
 Paul LaMalfa – assistant recording engineer
 Tom Lord-Alge – mix engineer 
 Andy Wallace – mix engineer 

Design
 Mike Giant – illustrations
 Estevan Oriol – photography
 Liam Ward – layout and design

Charts and certifications

Weekly charts

Year-end charts

Certifications

Notes

External links

 Neighborhoods at YouTube (streamed copy where licensed)
 
 

2011 albums
Albums produced by Mark Hoppus
Albums produced by Tom DeLonge
Albums produced by Travis Barker
Blink-182 albums
DGC Records albums
Interscope Records albums